Tsivozersky Pogost is a rural locality (a village) in Belosludskoye Rural Settlement of Krasnoborsky District, Arkhangelsk Oblast, Russia. The population was two as of 2010.

Geography 
Tsivozersky Pogost is located 26 km north of Krasnoborsk (the district's administrative centre) by road. Sidorovskaya is the nearest rural locality.

References

Rural localities in Krasnoborsky District